Pan Changjiang (born July 1957) is a Chinese skit actor, sitcom actor, and recently turned TV director. In his early years, he appeared regularly in the CCTV New Year's Gala.

Life
Pan was born to an acting family in Dongning County, Mudanjiang, Heilongjiang, the son of Wang Jingping, and Pan Linsheng. In 1979, he was accepted to the Pingju Troupe of Tieling County, where he majored in acting.

Personal life
On 31 August 1981, Pan married civil servant Yang Yun in Dongning County, their daughter, Pan Yang, was born in 1985.

Filmography

Film

Television

CCTV New Year's Gala

Award

References

External links
 
 Pan Changjiang at chinesemov.com

1957 births
Living people
20th-century Chinese male actors
21st-century Chinese male actors
People from Mudanjiang
Male actors from Heilongjiang
Chinese television presenters
Singers from Heilongjiang
Chinese male film actors
Chinese male television actors
Chinese male comedians
Chinese male singers
Ping opera actors
Chou actors